The Serbian Football Championship season of 1920–21 was the second championship organised by the Serbian Football Federation (Srpski loptački savez) after the 1919–20 season. Played among the clubs from the territory of the city of Belgrade, the Belgrade Football Subassociation.

First League (1. Razred)

Second Leagues
Banat League

Participating:
Obilić Veliki Bečkerek
Vašaš Veliki Bečkerek
Viktorija Veliki Bečkerek
ŽSE Žombolj
ŽTK Žombolj
Šveboše Žombolj
DSK Debeljača
KAC Velika Kikinda

Provincial League - Župa 1

Participating:
Vojvodina Novi Sad
NAK Novi Sad
NSK Zemun
ASK Zemun
PSK Pančevo
RSK Ruma

Provincial League - Župa 2

Participating:
Zora Bijeljina
Podrinje Bijeljina
Jedinstvo Brčko
Sloga Brčko
Građanski Sremska Mitrovica
Srpski SK Sremska Mitrovica
Sloga Šabac
Srpski mač Valjevo

Provincial League - Župa 2

Participating:
Jedinstvo Vranje
Moravac Leskovac
Jug Bogdan Prokuplje
Zlatibor Užice
Šumadija Kragujevac
PSK Požarevac

See also
1919–20 Serbian Football Championship
Yugoslav First League
Serbian SuperLiga

External links
 League table at RSSSF

Serbian Football Championship
Serbia
Serbia
Football
Football